Racova may refer to several places in Romania:

 Racova, a commune in Bacău County
 Racova, a village in Ilovăţ Commune, Mehedinţi County
 Racova, a village in Supur Commune, Satu Mare County
 Racova, a village in Udeşti Commune, Suceava County
 Racova, a village in Gârceni Commune, Vaslui County
 Racova, a tributary of the Bistrița in Bacău County
 Racova (Bârlad), a tributary of the Bârlad in Vaslui County
 Racova, a tributary of the Suceava in Suceava County

See also 
 Racovăț (disambiguation)
 Racovița (disambiguation)
 Racoviță (surname)
 Racoș (disambiguation)